Mercantile Building may refer to:

 10 East 40th Street, 48-story, 193 m (632 ft) skyscraper, also referred to as the Mercantile Building, in Manhattan, New York
 Mercantile National Bank Building, 31-story, 159.4 m (523 ft) skyscraper at 1700 Main Street, Dallas, Texas
 Mercantile Continental Building, building located at 1810 Commerce Street, Dallas, Texas 
 Sun Mercantile Building,  warehouse building in Phoenix, Arizona
 Mercantile Building Society, defunct UK building society